Trachelyopterus is a genus of driftwood catfishes

Species 
This genus currently contains 16 described species:
 Trachelyopterus albicrux (C. Berg (es), 1901)
 Trachelyopterus amblops (Meek & Hildebrand, 1913)
 Trachelyopterus analis (C. H. Eigenmann & R. S. Eigenmann, 1888)
 Trachelyopterus brevibarbis (Cope, 1878)
 Trachelyopterus ceratophysus (Kner, 1858)
 Trachelyopterus coriaceus Valenciennes, 1840
 Trachelyopterus fisheri (C. H. Eigenmann, 1916) (Driftwood catfish)
 Trachelyopterus galeatus (Linnaeus, 1766)
 Trachelyopterus insignis (Steindachner, 1878)
 Trachelyopterus isacanthus (Cope, 1878)
 Trachelyopterus lacustris (Lütken, 1874)
 Trachelyopterus leopardinus (Borodin, 1927)
 Trachelyopterus lucenai Bertoletti (pt), J. F. P. da Silva & E. H. L. Pereira, 1995
 Trachelyopterus peloichthys (L. P. Schultz, 1944)
 Trachelyopterus striatulus (Steindachner, 1877) (Singing catfish)
 Trachelyopterus teaguei (Devincenzi, 1942)

References

Auchenipteridae
Fish of South America
Catfish genera
Taxa named by Achille Valenciennes